Saddlebag Lake Resort is a snowbird subdivision near the outskirts of Lake Wales, Florida in Polk County. The population ranges from a full-time resident population of 200 to a seasonal snowbird population of around 1,350.  There is a sizeable Canadian snowbird population.   There are 787 homesites.  The park is 9 miles west of Lake Wales, Florida in unincorporated Polk County.

History
Saddlebag Lake Resort was platted in 1973 by two investors after trying to find a lake to fish in for the summer.  The brothers bought more than 100 acres from the state and invested in a Campground and sold campsites to campers.  Although sold as campsites, the lots were approved in 1994 to site manufactured homes.  As of 2015, most of the developed sites house trailers/roofovers.  There is a significant recreational infrastructure including clubhouse, billiards, pool, tennis, horseshoe, driving range, and boat dock.

References

Populated places in Polk County, Florida
1973 establishments in Florida
Populated places established in 1973